The Westin Building Exchange is a major telecommunications hub facility located downtown Seattle, Washington. The building was constructed in 1981 as the Westin Building, housing the corporate offices of Westin Hotels, which was then based in Seattle.  It is also home to the Seattle Internet Exchange (SIX) and Pacific Northwest Gigapop's Pacific Wave Exchange.

The facility has a pair of "Meet-me Rooms" on the 19th floor, which are used by telecommunication carriers and internet service providers to cross-connect their individual networks. These carriers situate their POPs within racks spread throughout the building, connecting back to the meet-me room via optical fiber cabling, facilitating interconnection with other carriers' infrastructure within the building. The Westin Building's meet-me room is the heart of the facility, where buyers and sellers of broadband services offer interconnectivity to their backbones and diverse services without the need to utilize telephone company provided interconnections.

In 2020, real estate investment trust Digital Realty acquired a majority stake in the building and assumed management responsibilities.

References

External links
 The Westin Building Exchange official site
 Seattle Internet Exchange

Skyscraper office buildings in Seattle
Office buildings completed in 1981
Telecommunications buildings in the United States